Dirk Marcellis (born 13 April 1988) is a former Dutch footballer who played as a centre back. After a non-playing period at PSV Marcellis fought back at AZ and became one of its important players. After suffering from injuries, he signed with NAC Breda in January 2015. He signed with PEC Zwolle after NAC was relegated. He retired in 2018 due to a severe knee injury.

Club career

PSV Eindhoven
Born in Horst aan de Maas, Marcellis began his professional career at PSV Eindhoven. Despite being short for a central defender, Marcellis worked his way up the ladder at the club, and eventually played his way in the starting line-up, forming a confident pair with Mexican defender Carlos Salcido. It was then that Marcellis was first really noticed by the bigger audience. He managed himself quite comfortably in the PSV defence, and almost effortlessly replaced the highly rated Brazilian central defender Alex, who went back to Chelsea after being loaned by PSV for several seasons. On 30 July 2009, Marcellis scored a last-minute goal against Bulgarian side PFC Cherno More Varna to help his team to a 1–0 home win in a third qualifying round game of the UEFA Europa League. He transferred to AZ after they sold their striker Jeremain Lens to PSV.

AZ
On 21 May 2010, he was involved with the deal with Jeremain Lens. Lens went to PSV and AZ contracted Marcellis. After a non-playing period at PSV, Marcellis fought back at AZ and became one of the more reliable defenders in the league. Unfortunately he injured his knee in May 2013 and as a result he missed the whole 2013–14 season. After his contract expired in July 2014, he was released. However, in October 2014, he was given an opportunity to earn a new contract with the Alkmaar side by signing an amateur deal. He returned as a substitute in the match against Feyenoord on 14 December 2014.

NAC Breda
On 31 December 2014, it was announced that Marcellis had signed with Eredivisie side NAC Breda until the end of the season. Upon arrival he was named captain by trainer Robert Maaskant.

International career

Youth

After impressing with PSV both in the UEFA Cup against Tottenham Hotspur and Fiorentina, where he played solid games against Dimitar Berbatov and Adrian Mutu, Marcellis caught the eye of not only Dutch football fans but also the Netherlands U-21 coach Foppe de Haan.
De Haan was quoted as saying, "Verrek, we hebben weer een echte verdediger",
meaning: "Damn, we have a real defender again."
De Haan almost immediately included Marcellis in the squad and let him make his debut for the Netherlands U-21. Marcellis didn't disappoint by playing very solidly in defence, game after game. Not only on his preferred place in central defence but at times also as a right-back.
He was a star on the rise, and the Dutch people recognised his great quality and potential. With the press and public often comparing him with his idol; former Dutch defender Jaap Stam, naming him as the biggest contender to fill the gap that the widely known Stam left in the Dutch defence. However, he has yet to live up to his promise.

2008 Beijing Summer Olympics
He was selected for the Netherlands Olympic squad and was absolute first choice central defender during the entire run-up to the Olympics, where he made a confident impression, seldom making a mistake. He played in all the group games, where the Dutch barely qualified for the quarter finals, coming second on points. He also played the quarter-final against Argentina, where they were eliminated. After the full 90 minutes and extra time had resulted in a 1–1 draw, they surprisingly lost 2–1.

Senior
He received his first call-up under national team coach Bert van Marwijk for the 2010 FIFA World Cup qualification matches against Norway & Iceland. He made his debut on 11 October 2008, against Iceland.

Career statistics

Honours

Club
PSV
Eredivisie (1): 2007–08
Johan Cruijff Shield (1): 2008
AZ
KNVB Cup (1): 2012–13

References

External links
 

1988 births
Living people
People from Horst aan de Maas
Association football defenders
Dutch footballers
Netherlands international footballers
PSV Eindhoven players
AZ Alkmaar players
NAC Breda players
PEC Zwolle players
Eredivisie players
Footballers at the 2008 Summer Olympics
Olympic footballers of the Netherlands
Footballers from Limburg (Netherlands)